The following outline is provided as an overview of and topical guide to the September 11 attacks and their consequences:

The September 11 attacks were four coordinated suicide attacks upon the United States in New York City and the Washington, D.C., area on September 11, 2001. On that Tuesday morning, 19 terrorists from the Islamist militant group al-Qaeda hijacked four passenger jets. The hijackers intentionally crashed two planes, American Airlines Flight 11 and United Airlines Flight 175, into the Twin Towers of the World Trade Center in New York City; both towers collapsed within two hours. Hijackers crashed American Airlines Flight 77 into the Pentagon in Arlington, Virginia. The fourth jet, United Airlines Flight 93, crashed into a field near Shanksville, Pennsylvania, after passengers attempted to take control before it could reach the hijacker's intended target in Washington, D.C. Nearly 3,000 died in the attacks, and the September 11 attacks have had broad and lasting consequences to military policy, politics, and foreign relations. Effects have also been seen in literature, film, and popular culture.

Before the attacks
Bin Ladin Determined To Strike in US
Motives for the September 11 attacks
Planning of the September 11 attacks

On the morning of September 11, 2001, 19 al-Qaeda terrorists hijacked four commercial passenger jet airliners, intentionally crashing two into the World Trade Center in New York City. The hijackers crashed a third airliner into the Pentagon. The fourth plane crashed in a field near Shanksville, Pennsylvania. Nearly 3,000 victims and the 19 hijackers died in the attacks.

Emergency response
U.S. military response during the September 11 attacks
Rescue and recovery effort after the September 11 attacks on the World Trade Center
Communication during the September 11 attacks
Radio communications during the September 11 attacks
New York City Police Department
New York City Fire Department
Operation Yellow Ribbon
Operation Support

Casualties
Casualties of the September 11 attacks
The Falling Man
Cantor Fitzgerald
Lists of victims of the September 11 attacks
United Airlines Flight 93 victims
World Trade Center Captive Insurance Company
September 11th Fund
September 11th Victim Compensation Fund
James Zadroga

Perpetrators
The leader of al Qaeda, Osama bin Laden, eventually claimed responsibility for the attacks.
Responsibility for the September 11 attacks
al-Qaeda
Osama bin Laden
Hijackers in the September 11 attacks
20th hijacker
Death of Osama bin Laden

Consequences
Reactions to the September 11 attacks
Closings and cancellations following the September 11 attacks
Airport security repercussions due to the September 11 attacks
Economic effects of the September 11 attacks
Health effects arising from the September 11 attacks
Post-9/11

Military
The United States launched the War on Terror, invading Afghanistan.
War on Terror
War in Afghanistan (2001–2021)

Social
Murder of Balbir Singh Sodhi
Murder of Ross Parker
Families of September 11
Cultural influence of the September 11 attacks
Lost artworks#Works destroyed in the September 11 attacks

Political
The US enacted the USA PATRIOT Act. Many other countries also strengthened their anti-terrorism legislation and expanded law enforcement powers.

United Nations Security Council Resolution 1368
U.S. government response to the September 11 attacks
Detentions following the September 11 attacks
Legal issues related to the September 11 attacks

Economic
Some American stock exchanges stayed closed for the rest of the week following the attack and posted enormous losses on reopening, especially in the airline and insurance industries. The destruction of billions of dollars' worth of office space caused serious damage to the economy of Lower Manhattan.

Economic effects of the September 11 attacks
Financial assistance following the September 11 attacks

Memorials
The Pentagon Memorial was built adjacent to the building. The rebuilding process has started on the World Trade Center site. In 2006, a new office tower was completed on the site of 7 World Trade Center. The new One World Trade Center was later built and was completed in 2014. Three more towers were originally expected to be built between 2007 and 2012 on the site, but are now delayed to 2018. Ground was broken for the Flight 93 National Memorial on November 8, 2009, and the first phase of construction is expected to be ready for the 10th anniversary of the attacks on September 11, 2011.

9/11 Tribute Center
Survivors' Staircase
World Trade Center cross
International Freedom Center
Memorials and services for the September 11 attacks
National September 11 Memorial & Museum
Patriot Day
The Rolling Memorial
World Trade Center Memorial finalists
Take Back The Memorial
Memory Foundations
Victims of Terrorist Attack on the Pentagon Memorial

Rebuilding
World Trade Center rebuilding controversy

People and organizations
Osama bin Laden
George W. Bush
Minoru Yamasaki
Rudy Giuliani during the September 11 attacks
Larry Silverstein
Port Authority of New York and New Jersey
Project Rebirth
THINK Team
Daniel Libeskind
:Category:People associated with the September 11 attacks

Locations and structures
The original World Trade Center (WTC) was a complex of seven buildings in Lower Manhattan in New York City that was destroyed September 11, 2001. The site is being rebuilt with six new skyscrapers and a memorial to the casualties of the attacks.
 
World Trade Center
World Trade Center (PATH station)
One World Trade Center
Marriott World Trade Center
4 World Trade Center
5 World Trade Center
6 World Trade Center
7 World Trade Center
Deutsche Bank Building
St. Nicholas Greek Orthodox Church
Verizon Building
List of tenants in One World Trade Center
List of tenants in Two World Trade Center
Collapse of the World Trade Center
World Trade Center site
Stonycreek Township, Somerset County, Pennsylvania
Shanksville, Pennsylvania
The Pentagon
Lower Manhattan
Fresh Kills Landfill
The Bathtub

Aircraft used in the attacks
American Airlines Flight 11
American Airlines Flight 77
United Airlines Flight 93
United Airlines Flight 175

Investigations
PENTTBOM
9/11 Commission
9/11 Commission Report
Criticism of the 9/11 Commission
Trials related to the September 11 attacks
Joint Inquiry into Intelligence Community Activities before and after the Terrorist Attacks of September 11, 2001

Film, television, literature, and photography
List of cultural references to the September 11 attacks
List of entertainment affected by the September 11 attacks
Cultural influence of the September 11 attacks
Aftermath: World Trade Center Archive
Raising the Flag at Ground Zero
The Falling Man
The Looming Tower
Flight 175: As the World Watched
September 11 Photo Project

Categories
:Category:September 11 attacks
:Category:World Trade Center
:Category:Documentary films about the September 11 attacks

See also
List of terrorist incidents in 2001
9/11 conspiracy theories
United States Environmental Protection Agency September 11 attacks pollution controversy

External links 

September 11 attacks
September 11 attacks
.